Zlateče is a settlement in the Municipality of Vojnik in eastern Slovenia. It lies north of Nova Cerkev, on the left side of the road to Vitanje. The area is part of the traditional region of Styria. It is now included with the rest of the municipality in the Savinja Statistical Region.

References

External links
Zlateče at Geopedia

Populated places in the Municipality of Vojnik